Stephen M. Schmerin is a former Secretary of the Pennsylvania Department of Labor and Industry, a cabinet-level department in the Government of Pennsylvania. He resigned in 2008.

References

Living people
State cabinet secretaries of Pennsylvania
Pennsylvania Democrats
Year of birth missing (living people)